is a 2003 Japanese yakuza film directed by Takashi Miike.

Plot
A yakuza gang member seeks revenge after his boss is murdered by an assassin.

Cast
Masaya Kato as Azusa
Shōko Aida
Naomi Akimoto
Narumi Arimori
Kenichi Endō
Tatsuya Fuji
Mitsuru Hirata
Renji Ishibashi
Masaya Kato
Hiroshi Katsuno
Kazuki Kitamura
Masaomi Kondo
Shigeru Kōyama
Hiroki Matsukata
Ryōsuke Miki
Yasukaze Motomiya
Hiroyuki Nagato
Chikage Natsuyama
Nobuo Kawai
Jinpachi Nezu
Masaki Nomura
Masahiko Tsugawa

Other credits
Produced by:
Michinao Kai - producer
Shigeji Maeda - associate planner
Fujio Matsushima - planner
Makiko Natsuyama - producer
Shizuka Natsuyama - executive producer: Cinema Paradise/Shinema Paradaisu
Shōichirō Natsuyama - associate planner
Yasuko Natsuyama - executive producer: Cinema Paradise/Shinema Paradaisu
Tsuneo Seto - planner
Kōzō Tadokoro - producer
Shigenori Takechi - planner
Production Design: Tatsuo Ozeki
Sound Department: Yoshiya Obara - sound

References

External links
 

2003 films
2000s Japanese-language films
Films directed by Takashi Miike
Yakuza films
2000s Japanese films